Sesame Street Stays Up Late! is a 1993 Sesame Street New Year's Eve television special with guest appearances of characters from the international versions of Sesame Street. The special was produced by the Children's Television Workshop in association with Norddeutscher Rundfunk, Israel Educational Television, NHK, Televisa S.A. de C.V., Norsk Rikskringkasting and Radiotelevisão Portuguesa, the respective broadcasters of the respective international co-productions featured in the special.

It aired on December 29, 1993 on PBS, and also marked Steve Whitmire's first performance as Ernie.

Plot
It is New Year's Eve on Sesame Street and everyone is planning on celebrating. Big Bird sees all the adults and mentions that while they're going to their own parties, Gina and Savion are helping the kids hold their own party on the street. Meanwhile, other things happen: Baby Bear doesn't know when New Year's Eve happens for real, Snuffy is fast asleep, and Telly Monster discovers that the current year ending, which upsets him. The others show him that the New Year is celebrated all over the world, so he calms a bit.

How New Year's traditions are celebrated is through the Monster News Network, hosted by Elmo. Throughout the special, segments featuring Sesame characters from different co-productions around the world, beginning with Mexico, represented by Rosita and Elmo's Cousin Pepe, who show how to celebrate using Pinatas. Zoe questions how they are going to know when it's midnight, but then one of the kids mentions that her parents went to Times Square the previous year and saw a Ball being dropped from a tall building at midnight. When Big Bird hears this, he knows exactly who to find, eventually finding Wolfgang the Seal to balance a beach ball that Big Bird found. Savion then questions how Wolfgang will know about what exact time midnight will be, and then Count von Count arrives to help everybody out, counting down the seconds to the New Year.

Oscar the Grouch is trying to call up his family, but the telephone operator says to him that all the lines are busy and that she can't do it for him. Telly interrupts Oscar and panics with him about the new year, but Oscar soon comes up with false claims about it, and sends Telly into a meltdown, as Telly starts a campaign to prevent the new year from coming to Sesame Street. Elmo then shows off another way of celebrating, with Tita from Rua Sésamo representing the country of Portugal, and showing how they use Grapes to celebrate. Afterwards, as everyone is trying to wake up Snuffy, they are soon interrupted by a figure wearing a coat, sunglasses and a white beard, claiming to be part of the "Department of Celebrations and Parties" and deems Sesame Street is right in the middle of a "No Party Zone". However, the figure turns out to be a disguised Telly, trying to stop the New Year from arriving and doesn't admit to defeat.

Oscar continues on with his phone problems, while Elmo shows off how Japan celebrates the New Year, represented by his cousin Elmo-nosque, who shows how everyone makes cards for each other and then soon help to hit rice to make cakes, and during New Year's Day, play home-made badminton. He soon showcases how Israel celebrated the New Year three months ago, represented by Moishe Oofnik (here referred to as "Oofnik the Grouch") and Kippi Ben Kippod from Rechov Sumsum. They show that happiness and goodness is an example of such, as well as Meanwhile, Telly is trying to temp Wolfgang into eating a fish so he can steal the ball, but this plot fails as well.

Afterwards, Telly soon goes missing, with Gina and Savion trying to look for him. Elmo then showcases how Germany celebrates, represented by Tiffy, Samson and Finchen from Sesamstrasse. They showcase how they dress up and go collecting treats around houses, similar to Halloween. As the seconds go down and down, Gina still can't find Telly, and Big Bird still can't wake up Snuffy. The last country Elmo showcases the New Year on Monster News Network is in Norway, represented by Max Mekker, Alfa and Bjarne Betjent from Sesam Stasjon, as they show the New Year's skiing tournament, and then travelling in a cart.

A parade of kids and Big Bird pass by the sleeping Snuffy as 73 seconds pass by, while Oscar is finally able to connect with his family. Gina soon finds Telly inside Finders Keepers, who tells him that nothing bad is going to happen and that the New Year is quite fun. Gina then tells him about New Year's Resolutions, and Telly soon quirks up hearing about everything he'll miss.

Everyone soon reaches to Around the Corner, with the adults returning from their parties, Snuffy waking up, and Elmo and his crew coming outside as everybody does the countdown and Wolfgang removes the ball in slow motion. When the ball drops to the ground, everyone cheers and welcomes in the new year. Baby Bear finally is able to know that is the New Year and finally manages to call it out. Meanwhile, Telly is amazed that everyone is still here and happily joins the celebration with everyone else. Big Bird soon calls out to everyone and makes a wish that everyone around the world should be friends as he eats the grape and sing "Faces That I Love".

The special ends with everybody shouting "Happy New Year!" as they continue to celebrate, even Slimey, much to Oscar's chagrin as he goes back into his trash can. Cookie Monster eats one of the letters in "THE END", deeming that he "Loves Credits!".

Cast

Live-action cast
 Alison Bartlett as Gina
 Savion Glover as Savion
 Linda Bove as Linda
 Ruth Buzzi as Ruthie
 Annette Calud as Celina
 Emilio Delgado as Luis
 Angel Jemmott as Angela
 Loretta Long as Susan
 Sonia Manzano as Maria
 Bob McGrath as Bob
 Roscoe Orman as Gordon
 Jou Jou Papailler as Jamal
 Lily Tomlin as Ernestine the Telephone Operator
 Carlo Alban as Carlo
 Tarah Schaeffer as Tarah
 Olivia Oguma as the Young Girl (from New York City)

Jim Henson's Sesame Street Muppets and voice cast
Caroll Spinney as Big Bird and Oscar the Grouch
Steve Whitmire as Ernie
Frank Oz as Bert, Cookie Monster, Grover, and Uncle Hank
Jerry Nelson as The Count
Fran Brill as Zoe, Roxie Marie, and Prairie Dawn
Kevin Clash as Elmo, Wolfgang the Seal, Cousin Pepe, Elmo-noske, Bjarne Betjent (voice), and the Announcer
Jim Martin as Max Mekker (voice)
Joey Mazzarino as MNN Logo Purple Monster, Grouches, and AM Monsters
Carmen Osbahr as Rosita
Pam Arciero as Alfa (voice), Telly Monster (assistant)
Martin P. Robinson as Telly, Snuffy, Slimey, and Mrs. Grouch
David Rudman as Baby Bear, MNN Logo Orange Monster, Grouches, and AM Monsters
Bryant Young as rear end of Snuffy
Ivy Austin as Tita (voice)

Additional Muppets performed by Jim Kroupa, Peter Linz, Rick Lyon, Stephanie D'Abruzzo, Noel MacNeal, and Alison Mork.

International Muppet performers and voice cast
 Gilles Ben-David as Moishe Oofnik (referred to as Oofnik the Grouch)
 Geir Børresen as Max Mekker
 Hanne Dahle as Alfa
 Uta Delbridge as Finchen
 Klaus Esch as Samson
 Åsmund Huser as Bjarne Betjent
 Paula Pais as Tita
 Marita Stolze as Tiffy
 Sarai Tzuriel as Kippi Ben Kippod
 Christine Stoesen as Py

Songs
 "We're Gonna Stay Up Late and Party"
 "Mexican Folk Song"
 "Oshogatsu"
 "Bashana Haba'ah"
 "Rummel Pot Song"
 "It's New Year's Eve"
 "New Year Chorale for Six Grouches"
 "Faces That I Love"

Home media/Digital releases
The special was originally released on VHS by Random House Home Video in 1994, where it was retitled as Sesame Street Celebrates Around the World, which is what all rereleases of the special would use. The VHS later reissued by Sony Wonder in 1996.

Sony Wonder released the special on DVD 2004, and was reissued by Genius Entertainment and Warner Home Video in 2008 and 2010, respectively.

The 2017 Amazon Video digital download release, reinstated the special's original title of Sesame Street Stays Up Late.

External links
 
 

Sesame Street features
1993 in American television
1993 television specials
New Year's television specials
Films directed by Chuck Vinson
1993 films
1990s English-language films
1990s American films